A suicide bombing was carried out on Gaza Street, Jerusalem on January 29, 2004. A Palestinian bomber detonated an explosive belt on an Egged bus #19 traveling between the two campuses of Hadassah Medical Center. Eleven passengers were killed and over 50 people were wounded, 13 of them seriously.

The attack
On January 29, 2004, shortly before 9:00 AM, a Palestinian suicide bomber detonated himself in the back of an Egged bus at the corner of Gaza and Arlozorov streets in Jerusalem, near the official residence of the Prime Minister of Israel. The blast tore the bus apart, blowing the roof into the air and breaking all the windows. The blast killed 11 people and injured more than 50. Thirteen were in serious condition.

The perpetrators
Both the Al Aqsa Martyrs' Brigades and Hamas claimed responsibility for the attack, which occurred less than 24 hours after eight Palestinians were killed in an Israeli army raid on the outskirts of Gaza, naming the bomber as Ali Yusuf Jaara, a 24-year-old Palestinian policeman from Bethlehem.

Aftermath
Originally the wreck of Bus 19 was maintained and stored by ZAKA in Jerusalem. The Jerusalem Connection, Int'l, a Christian Zionist organization  was invited by ZAKA to bring the bus to the USA. The wreck of the bus was on display first at the Hague for the International Court of Justice hearing about the Israeli West Bank barrier. The Jerusalem Connection then brought the bus to the USA where, under the cosponsorship of many Jewish and Christian organizations, churches, and synagogues, it was put on display in several cities and at various US universities.

Bus 19 is currently located permanently at Camp Shoresh in Adamstown, Md.

See also
Café Moment bombing

References

External links
 Suicide bombing of Egged bus no 19 in Jerusalem - 29-Jan-2004 - published at the Israeli Ministry of Foreign Affairs
 Suicide attack on Jerusalem bus - published on BBC News on January 29, 2004

Mass murder in 2004
Terrorist incidents in Jerusalem
2004 in Jerusalem
January 2004 events in Asia
Hamas suicide bombings of buses
Terrorist incidents in Jerusalem in the 2000s